Nail or Nails may refer to:

In biology
 Nail (anatomy), toughened protective protein-keratin (known as alpha-keratin, also found in hair) at the end of an animal digit, such as fingernail
 Nail (beak), a plate of hard horny tissue at the tip of some bird beaks

Objects
 Nail (fastener), the pin-shaped fastener used in engineering, woodworking and construction
 Nail (relic), used in the crucifixion of Christ
 The Exchange nails, bronze tables outside of The Exchange, Bristol

Arts and entertainment
 JLA: The Nail series, a 1998 three-issue comic book miniseries
 Nail (album), by Scraping Foetus Off The Wheel (1985)
 Nails (1979 film), a Canadian short documentary film
 Nails (1992 film), an American TV film
 Nails (2003 film), a Russian psychological horror film
 Nails (2017 film), a horror film directed by Dennis Bartok
 Nails (band), an American powerviolence band founded 2009
 Nine Inch Nails, an American industrial rock band founded 1988
 The Nails, an American new wave band founded 1976 as The Ravers (name change 1977)

People
 Nail (given name), a list of people with the given name Nail
 Nail (surname), a list of people with the surname Nail or Nails
 Lenny Dykstra, a former Major League Baseball outfielder nicknamed "Nails"
 Samuel Morton (1893–1923), an American mobster nicknamed "Nails"

Businesses
 Nail Brewing, an Australian brewery
 Nail Communications, an American advertising agency
 Nails Inc., an English nail care chain

Other uses
 Nail (unit), an archaic multiplier equal to one sixteenth of a base unit
 Nail, Arkansas, an unincorporated community in the United States
 Nail, project name for the Heirloom Project mailx Unix computer utility
 Soil nailing, a soil-stabilization technique

See also
NAIL (disambiguation)
 
 
Knell
 Neil (disambiguation)
Nell